Yuen Long Highway is a Hong Kong expressway connecting Au Tau in Yuen Long and Lam Tei in Tuen Mun of New Territories.

Part of Route 9, it bypasses Yuen Long Town and the rural areas of Lam Tei, Hung Shui Kiu and Ping Shan, providing a continuation of Tuen Mun Road to Yuen Long District.

History
Yuen Long Highway was completed in phases. The section known as "Yuen Long to Tuen Mun Eastern Corridor" during planning stage, which links the Lam Tei and Tong Yan San Tsuen interchanges, was opened on 1 July 1993. This was followed by the "Yuen Long Southern Bypass" between Tong Yan San Tsuen and Pok Oi Hospital by way of the Shap Pat Heung Interchange, the construction of which started in 1992 and finished in December 1994.

The opening of the Tai Lam Tunnel in 1998 brought additional traffic flows to Yuen Long Highway, causing congestion around the Pok Oi Interchange. A dual two-lane vehicular bridge was therefore constructed above the interchange with a view to easing the traffic volume channelling through the roundabout. With the opening of Pok Oi Flyover on 5 February 1999, vehicles travelling between Yuen Long Highway and Tai Lam Tunnel or San Tin Highway no longer have to enter the roundabout at Pok Oi Interchange.

In order to accommodate the expected traffic from Route 10 cross-border corridor to and from Shekou/Dongjiaotou in Shenzhen over Deep Bay, the road had been finished upgrading to a dual 3-lane carriageway from its original dual 2-lane carriageway in February 2006.

Interchanges

{| class="plainrowheaders wikitable"
|+  Yuen Long Highway
|-
!scope=col|Location
!scope=col|km
!scope=col|Interchange name
!scope=col|Exit
!scope=col|Destinations
!scope=col|Notes
|-
|rowspan=3|Au Tau
|style="text-align:right"|38.2
|rowspan=2|Au Tau Interchange
|style="text-align:center"|
| San Tin Highway – Lok Ma Chau, Sheung Shui
|Northern terminus;  continues.
|-
|style="text-align:right"|39.2
|style="text-align:center; background:#dff9f9;"|12
|style="background:#dff9f9"| ( Tsing Long Highway) – Tsuen Wan, Kowloon
|style="background:#dff9f9"|Northbound exit and southbound entrance
|-
|style="text-align:right"|39.9
|Pok Oi Interchange
|style="text-align:center"|13
|Castle Peak Road - Yuen Long – Yuen Long
|Southbound exit and northbound entranceReverse direction traffic exit via Shap Pat Heung Interchange
|-
|rowspan=2|Shap Pat Heung
|style="text-align:right"|41.0
|Shap Pat Heung Interchange
|style="text-align:center"|
|Shap Pat Heung Road / Tai Kei Leng Road – Yuen Long (South), Tai Tong
|
|-
|style="text-align:right"|43.2
|Tong Yan San Tsuen Interchange
|style="text-align:center"|14
|Long Tin Road (Yuen Long West Link) – Yuen Long (West), Tin Shui Wai (East)
|
|-
|Hung Shui Kiu
|style="text-align:right"|44.6
|Tin Shui Wai West Interchange
|style="text-align:center"|15
|Hung Tin Road – Hung Shui Kiu, Tin Shui Wai (West), Wetland Park
|
|-
|Lam Tei
|style="text-align:right"|46.6
|Lam Tei Interchange
|style="text-align:center; background:#dff9f9;"|16
|style="background:#dff9f9"| ( Kong Sham Western Highway) – Shenzhen Bay
|style="background:#dff9f9"|
|-
|rowspan=2|Fu Tei
|style="text-align:right"|47.6
|rowspan=2|Lam Tei Interchange
|style="text-align:center"|17
|Castle Peak Road - Lingnan – Fu Tei, UniversityCastle Peak Road - Lam Tei – Lam TeiTsing Lun Road – Tuen Mun (West)
|Southbound exit and northbound entrance
|-
|style="text-align:right"|48.1
|style="text-align:center"|
|Tuen Mun Road – Tuen Mun Town, Kowloon
|Southern terminus;  continues.

See also
List of expressways in Hong Kong

References

External links

Google Maps of Yuen Long Highway

Expressways in Hong Kong
Route 9 (Hong Kong)